The American Elm cultivar Ulmus americana 'Miller Park' is a selection made by the University of Minnesota. Originally identified as  MNT-0365, it was cloned from an old elm surviving in Hennepin County, Minnesota. 'Miller Park' is currently (2016) being researched but no data have yet been published. The tree is named for the eponymous park in Eden Prairie, in the environs of Minneapolis.

Description
No details yet available.

Pests and diseases
'Miller Park' was found to have a resistance to Dutch elm disease.  No other specific information available, but the species generally is also moderately preferred for feeding and reproduction by the adult Elm Leaf Beetle Xanthogaleruca luteola, and highly preferred for feeding by the Japanese Beetle Popillia japonica  in the United States.
U. americana is the most susceptible of all the elms to verticillium wilt.

Cultivation
The tree was used as a control alongside 'Valley Forge' in the assessment of another Ulmus americana clone, 'St Croix'.

References

American elm cultivar
Ulmus articles missing images
Ulmus